The Old Supreme Court Building is the former courthouse of the Supreme Court of Singapore, before it moved out of the building and commenced operations in the new building on 20 June 2005. The building was the last structure in the style of classical architecture to be built in the former British colony.  The building, together with the City Hall, has been converted into National Gallery Singapore which was opened in 2015.

History

On 1 April 1937, the original foundation stone of the Old Supreme Court Building, (then the biggest foundation stone in the whole of Malaya) was laid by the Governor of the Straits Settlements, Sir Shenton Whitelegge Thomas. Buried beneath the stone, is a time capsule containing six Singaporean newspapers dated 31 March 1937, and a handful of coins of the Straits Settlements. The capsule is not due to be retrieved until the year 3000.

The building was declared open on 3 August 1939 by Sir Shenton Thomas and handed over to the Chief Justice, Sir Percy McElwaine, on the same day.

The building was the site of war crime trials of members of the Japanese Imperial Army in 1946 after the World War II.

The Old Supreme Court Building, together with the adjacent City Hall, was converted into the National Gallery Singapore opened in 2015.

Architecture and design

The Old Singapore Supreme Court building was designed by Frank Dorrington Ward. It was built in front of the Padang grounds between 1937 and 1939.

See also

 Supreme Court, Singapore
 City Hall MRT station

Notes
.
History of Supreme Court

References

Government buildings in Singapore
National monuments of Singapore
Tourist attractions in Singapore
Government buildings completed in 1939
Downtown Core (Singapore)
Courthouses
20th-century architecture in Singapore